Gnathmocerodes lecythocera is a moth of the family Tortricidae. It was described by Edward Meyrick in 1937. It is found on Java and Fiji.

The larvae feed on the leaves and fruits of Barringtonia species, the leaves of Annonaceae species and the fruits of Urena lobata.

References

 Gnathmocerodes lecythocera in gbif

Moths described in 1937
Olethreutini